The 1982 NAIA Division I football season was the 27th season of college football sponsored by the NAIA, was the 13th season of play of the NAIA's top division for football.

The season was played from August to November 1982 and culminated in the 1982 NAIA Champion Bowl, played this year on December 18, 1982 at Wantland Stadium in Edmond, Oklahoma on the campus of Central State University (now Central Oklahoma).

Central State (OK) defeated Mesa State in the Champion Bowl, 14–11, to win their second NAIA national title.

Conference standings

Conference champions

Postseason

See also
 1982 NAIA Division II football season
 1982 NCAA Division I-A football season
 1982 NCAA Division I-AA football season
 1982 NCAA Division II football season
 1982 NCAA Division III football season

References

 
NAIA Football National Championship